Might or MIGHT may refer to:
 Power (social and political)
 might, an epistemic modal verb in English

Arts and entertainment
 Might (magazine), an American satirical periodical (1994–1997)
 Might!, a 1995 noise music album by Boyd Rice ("NON")
 "Might", a song on Modest Mouse's 1996 album This Is a Long Drive for Someone with Nothing to Think About

Other uses
 USS Might (PG-94), an American gunboat
 Malaysian Industry Government Group for High Technology, a tech think tank

See also 
 Mighty (disambiguation)
 Might makes right, an aphorism on morality
 Mite (disambiguation)